Vyacheslav Ivanovich Lebedev (January 27, 1930 – March 22, 2010) was a Soviet and Russian mathematician, known for his work on numerical analysis.

Career 
Lebedev was a Ph.D. student of Sobolev. He worked at the Kurchatov Institute and Soviet/Russian Academy of Sciences, and taught students at the Moscow State University and Moscow Institute of Physics and Technology. He authored over a hundred papers and several books, most noticeably "Numerical methods in the theory of neutron transport" jointly with Gury Marchuk and "Functional Analysis in Computational Mathematics," based on his lectures. He graduated over 15 Ph.D.'s. Lebedev quadrature has become one of the popular methods of integration on a sphere.

Areas of expertise 
He worked in many areas of computational and applied mathematics, ranging from software development for nuclear reactors modeling to approximation by polynomials, from quadrature on a sphere to numerical solution of stiff for which he developed explicit Chebyshev methods called DUMKA, systems of PDEs, from domain decomposition and Poincaré–Steklov operators to Finite difference methods, from iterative solvers to parallel computing. He even contributed to finding the roots of a cubic equation.

Awards 
He was a recipient of the Soviet State Award for developing mathematical methods of particle transport theory in 1987 and Chebyshev Gold medal in 2002–03.

Notes
 http://www.netlib.org/na-digest-html/10/v10n13.html#1 Vyacheslav Ivanovich Lebedev, January 27, 1930 – March 22, 2010

References

External links

 Vyacheslav Lebedev — scientific works on the website Math-Net.Ru
from RAS.RU (In Russian)
from KIAE.RU (In Russian)

Russian mathematicians
Soviet mathematicians
Numerical analysts
Moscow State University alumni
1930 births
2010 deaths